Lindy Robbins is an American songwriter from Los Angeles, whose songs include Demi Lovato's "Skyscraper", Jason Derulo's "Want to Want Me", David Guetta's "Dangerous" featuring Sam Martin, MKTO's "Classic", Hot Chelle Rae's "Tonight, Tonight", Jason Derulo's "It Girl" and Astrid S' "Hurts So Good", as well as songs recorded by Dua Lipa, Jennifer Hudson, and One Direction.

Background 

Robbins grew up in the San Fernando Valley, California. She started singing with her musician father Wally when she was three years old, and was a performer in New York City and Los Angeles before becoming a full-time songwriter in 1997. Robbins now resides in Los Angeles.

Career 
Robbins was written songs for many artists in the music industry.

Recent number-one radio hits include: "Want to Want Me" by Jason Derulo, "Dangerous" by David Guetta (feat. Sam Martin), "Tonight, Tonight" by Hot Chelle Rae, and "Day Drunk" by Morgan Evans. Other chart-toppers include: "Skyscraper" by Demi Lovato, "Classic" by MKTO, "Slow Down", "It Girl", "Miss Movin' On" by Fifth Harmony, "Kiss Me" by [Olly Murs], "Hurts so Good" by Astrid S, and "Crybaby" by Paloma Faith.

Lindy is also known for the following top-five singles: "Incomplete" by the Backstreet Boys, "What's Left of Me" by Nick Lachey, and Cinderella" by The Cheetah Girls.

Additional key releases include songs recorded by: Dua Lipa, Zedd, Bebe Rexha, LeAnn Rimes, One Direction, Jennifer Hudson, Rachel Platten, 5 Seconds of Summer, Jennifer Lopez, Leona Lewis (featuring One Republic), Faith Hill, Brandy, Britney Spears, Jason Mraz, Westlife, Shaggy, Jordin Sparks, Lisa Loeb, Clay Aiken, Toni Braxton, Monica, and Audra McDonald.

Discography 
2023

2022

2021

2020

2019

2018

2017

2016

2015

2014

2013

2012

2011

2010

2009

2008

2007

2006

2005

2003

2002

2001

2000

1999

1998

References

External links 
 Lindy Robbins website
 Kobalt Music

Living people
Songwriters from California
Musicians from Los Angeles
Writers from Los Angeles
Year of birth missing (living people)